Celeste Farotti (1864 – 1928) was a violin maker in the modern Milanese school. 
Though his apprenticeship is uncertain, he completed his training in the workshop of Leandro Bisiach, finally opening his own shop in Milan around 1900. He was a connoisseur of Italian violin making, and a gifted copyist. After an accident during a mountain trip, Celeste stopped working and his nephew, Celestino Farotto (born 1905), ran the shop until his death.

An air of mystery surrounds some of his work, and there are many legends about him, as there are about other makers who made "copies" of instruments that they made look old. Like Gaetano Sgarabotto or Vincenzo Sannino, he frequently enjoyed reproducing the wear and tear of antique instruments.

Bibliography

References
La Liuteria Italiana / Italian Violin Making in the 1800s and 1900s - Umberto Azzolina
I Maestri Del Novicento - Carlo Vettori 
La Liuteria Lombarda del '900 - Roberto Codazzi, Cinzia Manfredini  2002
Dictionary of 20th Century Italian Violin Makers - Marlin Brinser 1978

External links
 A beautiful example of a Celeste Farotti Cello, 1903

1864 births
1928 deaths
Italian luthiers
Musicians from Milan
19th-century Italian musicians